Keningau Airport (Malay: Lapangan Terbang Keningau) , alternately Keningau Airstrip, is a privately owned domestic airport serving the city of Keningau in the state of Sabah, Malaysia. It is 2.5 km from Keningau Town.

History

Many years ago, the Keningau Airport was used for aeroplanes with a small capacity like the BN-2 Islander and Fokker F27. The last flight to Keningau Airport for Malaysia Airlines was in the 1970s.

See also
 List of airports in Malaysia

References

Airports in Sabah
Defunct airports in Malaysia